The Chimney Sweeper's Boy (1998) is a crime/mystery novel by Barbara Vine, pseudonym of British author Ruth Rendell.

Plot summary

When successful author Gerald Candless dies of a sudden heart attack, his eldest daughter Sarah is approached by her father's publisher with a view to writing a biography about his life. Sarah embarks on the memoir but soon discovers that her perfect father was not all he appeared to be, and that in fact he wasn't Gerald Candless at all.

References

1998 British novels
Novels by Ruth Rendell
Works published under a pseudonym
Novels about writers
Viking Press books
Fictional chimney sweepers
Harmony Books books